Acutocapillitium is a genus of fungi that is tentatively placed in the family Agaricaceae; its phylogenetic relationships to other genera in the family are not well known. The genus contains three species found in tropical America.

References

Agaricaceae
Agaricales genera